Vanessa Magda Palacios Silva (born July 3, 1984, in Lima, Peru) is a Peruvian volleyball player who plays as Libero for the Peru women's national volleyball team.

Career
Palacios was awarded Best Libero in the 2009/10 season from the Spanish Superliga .

Clubs
  Divino Maestro
  CV Venidorm (2003–2008)
  CV Sanse (2008–2009)
  CV Tenerife (2009–2010)
  Divino Maestro (2010-2011)
  CV Tenerife (2011-2012)
  Vannes VB (2012-2013)
  CV Universidad César Vallejo (205-2016)
  Istres Provence Volley (2016-2017)
  Volley Club Marcq-en-Barœul (2017-)

Awards

Individuals
 2007 South American Championship "Best Digger"
 2007 Pan-American Cup "Best Receiver"
 2009 Pan-American Cup "Best Receiver"
 2009 Pan-American Cup "Best Libero"
 2009-2010 Spanish Superliga "Best Libero"
 2010 Final Four Cup "Best Receiver"
 2011 South American Championship "Best Receiver"
 2011-12 Liga Nacional Superior de Voleibol "Best Libero"

National Team

Senior Team
 2005 Bolivarian Games -  Gold Medal
 2009 South American Championship -  Bronze Medal
 2010 Women's Pan-American Volleyball Cup -  Silver Medal
 2010 Final Four Women's Cup -  Silver Medal
 2011 South American Championship -  Bronze Medal

References

External links

 FIVB Profile

1984 births
Living people
Sportspeople from Lima
Peruvian women's volleyball players